Gasparov and Gasparova (feminine; Гаспарова) is a Russian surname. 

People with this surname include:
Mikhail Gasparov (1935–2005), Russian philologist and translator
Samvel Gasparov (born 1938), Soviet and Russian film director

See also
Kasparov

Surnames from given names